Nurilyaa Natasya Mohamad Asri (born 1 January 2002) is a Malaysian cricketer. 
In January 2022, she made her T20I debut against Bangladesh. 
In October 2022, she played a few T20Is against Test playing teams in Women's Asia Cup.

References

External links
 

2002 births
Living people
Malaysian women cricketers
Malaysia women Twenty20 International cricketers